Laura Bortolotti (born 11 April 1960) is an Italian former freestyle swimmer. She competed in two events at the 1976 Summer Olympics.

References

External links
 

1960 births
Living people
Italian female freestyle swimmers
Olympic swimmers of Italy
Swimmers at the 1976 Summer Olympics
Sportspeople from Bologna